Right for Education (stylized as R:Ed)  is a private, nonprofit foundation working in online educational media in Africa. The foundation publishes free educational materials in English and French.

Right for Education's work reaches 6.9M followers through its Facebook page most of which are in Sub-Saharan Africa. Other outlets include TV and radio stations based in Africa. The organization has no political or religious ties.

A sister enterprise, REdy, was established in 2020 to support the growth of business in Africa.

History 

Right for Education was established in 2014 by Dr Susann Dattenberg-Doyle (styled Mama Ngoryisi in Ewe), a psychologist and Associate Fellow of the British Psychological Society. Ngoryisi first became involved in education in Ghana in 1999 and funded the creation of a school in 2004 in Kpoeta in the Upper Volta region

In 2006, Ngoryisi was made Queen of Gbi Kpoeta, taking the name Mama Ngoryisi. Despite initiatives to create further schools in the region, there remained many issues of accessibility to educational resources. As a result, Ngoryisi changed focus to providing educational materials to a greater audience by placing them online.

In 2012, Ngoryisi's company, I Do Philanthropy, was granted NGO status by the Ghanaian government.

Right for Education was founded in 2016. The foundation's website currently holds all its published educational materials.

In 2019, the foundation was approached to collaborate with the Ghanaian Ministry of Education.

Organisation 
Right for Education has registered charitable status in Ireland and NGO status in Ghana.

Its partners include Facebook and Oxford University.

Methodology 
Materials published by Right for Education are designed to have low data costs due to the scarcity of strong and inexpensive internet connections across Africa.

Topics covered include:

-          Human rights

-          Home and family

-          Law and governance

-          Health and medicine

-          Business

-          African culture

-          Science and technology

-          Environment

Since 2020, Right for Education has collaborated with Ghanaian TV network Crystal TV and UK-based educational platform The Learning Partnership to launch the World Challenge Cup, an international competition with STEM subject challenges.

References

Educational organisations based in Ghana